The Cambodian government has diplomatic relations with most countries, including the United States, the United Kingdom, and France, as well as all of its Asian neighbors, including China, India, Vietnam, Laos, South Korea, and Thailand. The government is a member of most major international organizations, including the United Nations and its specialized agencies such as the World Bank and International Monetary Fund. The government is an Asian Development Bank (ADB) member, a member of ASEAN, and of the WTO. In 2005 Cambodia attended the inaugural East Asia Summit. The government is also a member of the Pacific Alliance (as observer) and Shanghai Cooperation Organisation (as dialogue partner).

International disputes

Cambodia is involved in a dispute regarding offshore islands and sections of the boundary with Vietnam. In addition, the maritime boundary Cambodia has with Vietnam is undefined. Parts of Cambodia's border with Thailand are indefinite, and the maritime boundary with Thailand is not clearly defined.

Illicit drugs

Cambodia is a transshipment site for Golden Triangle heroin, and possibly a site of money laundering. There is corruption related to narcotics in parts of the government, military and police. Cambodia is also a possible site of small-scale opium, heroin, and amphetamine production. The country is a large producer of cannabis for the international market.

International organization participation

ACCT, AsDB, ASEAN, ESCAP, FAO, G-77, IAEA, IBRD, ICAO, ICC, ICRM, IDA, IFAD, IFC, IFRCS, ILO, IMF, IMO, Intelsat (nonsignatory user), International Monetary Fund, Interpol, IOC, ISO (subscriber), ITU, NAM, OPCW, PCA, UN, UNCTAD, UNESCO, UNIDO, UPU, WB, WFTU, WHO, WIPO, WMO, WTO, WToO, WTrO (applicant)

Diplomatic relations

Bilateral relations

Africa

Americas

Asia

Europe

Oceania

Country with no relations
There are 17 countries that haven't establish any diplomatic relations with Cambodia:

See also
List of diplomatic missions in Cambodia
List of diplomatic missions of Cambodia

References

Further reading
 Deth, Sok Udom, and Serkan Bulut, eds. Cambodia's Foreign Relations in Regional and Global Contexts (Konrad-Adenauer-Stiftung, 2017; comprehensive coverage) full book online free.
 Path Kosal, "Introduction: Cambodia's Political History and Foreign Relations, 1945-1998" pp 1–26 
 Acharya, Amitav. The Making of Southeast Asia: International Relations of A Region (Cornell UP, 2012)
 Chandler, David. The Tragedy of Cambodian History: Politics, War, and Revolution since 1945 (Yale UP, 1991)
 Ciorciari, John D. "Cambodia in 2019: Backing Further into a Corner." Asian Survey 60.1 (2020): 125–131. online
 Clymer, Kenton. Troubled Relations: The United States and Cambodia since 1870 (Northern Illinois UP, 2007).
 Leighton, Marian Kirsch. "Perspectives on the Vietnam-Cambodia border conflict." Asian Survey 18.5 (1978): 448–457.  online
 Leng, Thearith. "2016: A Promising Year for Cambodia?." Southeast Asian Affairs (2017): 133–146. online
 Morris, Stephen J. Why Vietnam invaded Cambodia: Political culture and the causes of war (Stanford University Press, 1999).
 Peou, Sorpong. "Cambodia in 2018: a year of setbacks and successes." Southeast Asian Affairs 2019.1 (2019): 104–119. online
 Richardson, Sophie. China, Cambodia and the Five Principles of Peaceful Coexistence (Columbia UP, 2010)
 Smith, Roger. Cambodia's Foreign Policy (Cornell UP, 1965).
 Un, Kheang, and Jing Jing Luo. "Cambodia in 2019: Entrenching One-Party Rule and Asserting National Sovereignty in the Era of Shifting Global Geopolitics." Southeast Asian Affairs 2020.1 (2020): 117–134. online
 Westad, Odd Arne, and Sophie Quinn-Judge, eds. The third Indochina war: conflict between China, Vietnam and Cambodia, 1972-79 (Routledge, 2006).
 Womack, Brantly. "Asymmetry and systemic misperception: China, Vietnam and Cambodia during the 1970s." Journal of Strategic Studies 26.2 (2003): 92-119 online.

External links
Ministry of Foreign Affairs and International Cooperation
US Department of State: Foreign relations with Southeast Asia 1961–63
Foreign relations between Cambodia and Germany
Japan-Cambodia Relations
List of foreign embassies in Cambodia
Foreign relations between Cambodia and Australia
AsiaSociety: essays relating to the development of Cambodia